Jeßnitz ( is a town and a former municipality in the district of Anhalt-Bitterfeld, in Saxony-Anhalt, Germany. It is situated on the river Mulde, north of Bitterfeld. Since 1 January 2010, it is part of the town Raguhn-Jeßnitz.

Towns in Saxony-Anhalt
Former municipalities in Saxony-Anhalt
Raguhn-Jeßnitz
Duchy of Anhalt

ro:Jeßnitz (Anhalt)